Hamand or Homand may refer to:
 Hamand, Fars
 Hamand, Khusf, South Khorasan Province
 Hamand, Nehbandan, South Khorasan Province

See also
Hamand Khaleseh Vadan
Hamand Kilan
Hamand Kuhan va Kurdar
Hamand Lamsar